J. Edward Hungerford (February 25, 1883 - April 25, 1964) was an American silent film screenwriter.

He wrote the scripts for well over 50 films between 1912 and 1921  such as Youth's Endearing Charm in 1916.

Selected filmography
 The Voice of Warning (1912)
 Susie's New Shoes (1914)
 The Spirit of Adventure (1915)
 Youth's Endearing Charm (1916)
 Crossed Clues (1921)
 The Driftin' Kid (1921)

External links
 

1883 births
1964 deaths
American male screenwriters
20th-century American male writers
20th-century American screenwriters